"Better Class of Losers" is a song co-written and recorded by American country music singer Randy Travis.  It was released in December 1991 as the third single from his album High Lonesome.  It peaked at number 2 in both the United States and Canada. Travis co-wrote this song with Alan Jackson. Travis' performance earned him the Grammy nomination for Best Male Country Vocal Performance, his fifth nomination in that category.

Content
The song is narrated from the point of view of a husband, who married a woman from "high society." Over the course of their relationship, he has grown to dislike both her friends and the high-class lifestyle she leads, and has announced his intent to associate with people who live a much simpler lifestyle, referring that they "buy their coffee beans already ground" and not "pay their bills on home computers" (which, in 1991, was a rarity).

However, the song is ambiguous as to the meaning of "going back." Though the narration is directed towards the wife, it is unclear whether he intends to seek a divorce, or simply stop attending high society functions with her.

Music video
The music video was directed by Jim Shea, and features Travis walking through various sets that convey the song's description, such as a high-rise penthouse set to a farm style set.

Musicians
As listed in liner notes.
Eddie Bayers - drums
Russ Barenberg - acoustic guitar
Dennis Burnside - piano
Jerry Douglas - dobro
Doyle Grisham - steel guitar
David Hungate - bass guitar
Mac McAnally - acoustic guitar
Brent Mason - 6 string bass, electric guitar
Mark O'Connor - fiddle
John Wesley Ryles - background vocals
Randy Travis - lead vocals
Dennis Wilson - background vocals
Curtis Young - background vocals

Use in media
This song was performed by Travis in the 2007 movie National Treasure: Book of Secrets, where he guest starred performing for the President of the United States at Mount Vernon.

It was also performed, in part, by Travis on a 1993 episode (The Mark) of "Matlock".  Travis plays character Billy Wheeler, a country singer hired by Matlock (Andy Griffith) to paint his house, and later accused of killing a con artist.

Chart performance

Year-end charts

References

1991 songs
1991 singles
Randy Travis songs
Songs written by Alan Jackson
Songs written by Randy Travis
Song recordings produced by Kyle Lehning
Warner Records singles